White Hall State Historic Site is a  park in Richmond, Kentucky, southeast of Lexington.

White Hall
The site's major feature is White Hall, the home of Kentucky legislator Cassius Marcellus Clay and Mary Jane Warfield Clay.  He was an anti-slavery newspaper publisher, politician, soldier and Minister to Russia through the Lincoln, Johnson and Grant administrations. He published True American for nearly 25 years.

This restored 44-room Italianate began as a 7-room structure built in 1798-1799 by General Green Clay. It was expanded and remodeled in the early 1860s to the structure seen today.

The site became part of the state park system in 1968.

On April 12, 2011, White Hall was designated as a national historic site in journalism by the Society of Professional Journalists, because of Clay's career as a publisher.

Restoration 
The house's restoration was completed and open to the public in 1971 under the leadership of Kentucky's First Lady Beula C. Nunn, with assistance of the Kentucky Mansions Preservation Foundation. In addition to the heirloom and period furnishings, White Hall has many unique features for its day, including indoor plumbing and central heating.

References

External links

White Hall State Historic Site Kentucky Department of Parks
 Photo of White Hall
 Photo of White Hall's stone kitchen building

Kentucky State Historic Sites
Protected areas of Madison County, Kentucky
Houses in Madison County, Kentucky
Museums in Madison County, Kentucky
Historic house museums in Kentucky
Houses on the National Register of Historic Places in Kentucky
National Register of Historic Places in Madison County, Kentucky
Italianate architecture in Kentucky
Georgian architecture in Kentucky
1968 establishments in Kentucky
Houses completed in 1799
Protected areas established in 1968
Green Clay family
Plantations in Kentucky
1799 establishments in Kentucky
Richmond, Kentucky